Lambert C. Mims (April 20, 1930 – November 25, 2008) was a politician and author who for two decades was a member of the City Commission of Mobile, Alabama (1965-1985). During this period, he also served co-terminously in several one-year terms as the commission's president and city's mayor. Deeply religious, he saw morality as a cornerstone of Mobile's community. His two decades in public service were overshadowed by a controversial corruption conviction in 1990.

Early life and education

Born on a farm in Uriah, Monroe County, Alabama, in 1930. His ancestors moved from South Carolina in the early 1800s, founding what was known as Fort Mims in what became Baldwin County, Alabama.

Career

Too young to serve in World War II, Mims moved to growing Mobile, Alabama when he was 19. After working as a salesman, Mims co-founded the Phillips-Mims Feed and Flour Company. In 1965, he started his own wholesale feed and flour company, Mims Brokerage.

Also in 1965, a year of racial divisiveness in Mobile as the Civil Rights era began, Mims ran successfully for public works commissioner of Mobile, one of the three-member city commission from which members rotated one year terms serving as Mobile's mayor. Mims won re-election four times, thus serving 20 years on the commission and several terms as mayor.

Mims was a member of Riverside Baptist Church on Dauphin Island Parkway (AL 163), and espoused public morality. In 1969 Mims published For Christ and Country, which in part decried "moral pollution" rather than environmental pollution as degrading the community. Thus he passed a local anti-pornography resolution and also shut down a play he considered too racy but being performed at the University of South Alabama, which had been created during his lengthy tenure. With federal and state assistance Mobile also completed the George Wallace Tunnels and the Interstate 10 Bayway, rebuilt Fort Conde, and the Tennessee-Tombigbee Waterway linked Mobile to the Tennessee River system including north Alabama.Mims also helped Mobile recover following the devastation of Hurricane Frederic in 1979.

At-large voting controversy 
Even before the riots which followed the assassination of Dr. Martin Luther King Jr. in 1968, Mims became known for clashing with the Neighborhood Organized Workers, a group of young African Americans including future city councilor Fred Richardson who opposed the gradualist policies of fellow-commissioner-until-1969 Joseph N. Langan and John LeFlore, a postal worker who had organized the local NAACP branch decades earlier.

Ultimately African Americans filed several lawsuits against to city in the 1970s, of which Wiley Bolton v. City of Mobile (concerning at-large voting's effect diluting African American voting rights) went to trial twice, as well as reached the U.S. Supreme Court in Mobile v. Bolden. After the first trial and decision by U.S. District Judge Virgil Pittman favored the black plaintiffs, the "Constitutional Crisis Committee" asked for the judge's impeachment, and Mims offered to sign the impeachment petition, but the city attorney advised against it. Although the Fifth Circuit upheld Judge Pittman, the United States Supreme Court reversed the judgment in Mobile v. Bolden, prompting a second hearing before Judge Pittman. Judge Pittman had postponed the 1977 city election, allowing the Mims and his two fellow committeemen elected in 1973 to remain in office.

Ultimately, a "smoking gun" letter was discovered and admitted into evidence—written by Mobile lawyer and Congressman Frederick G. Bromberg to the Alabama legislature in 1909 it indicated the purpose of the at-large system was to prevent blacks from holding office.  Both Commissioners Mims and Greenough promised not to appeal the second Bolden decision if the city lost, although Commissioner Robert Doyle avoided the issue. Ultimately, Doyle won re-election directly in 1981, and both Mims and Greenough won in runoffs.

The second Bolden decision, issued on April 15, 1982 also favored the plaintiffs. On January 31, 1983, rather than appeal, all parties agreed to a settlement whereby the next election for city office would be based on districts rather than at-large. The Alabama legislature passed appropriate legislation and 72% of state voters on May 15, 1985 approved switching to a Mayor-council government. Three African Americans were elected among the 7 new districts, the first blacks to serve in Mobile's government since Reconstruction.

Thus, Mims became the last mayor of Mobile to govern through the non-partisan city commission system which dated from 1911. In 1985 Mims chose against running for mayor or a seat representing one of the new districts.

Indictment and conviction

In 1989, Mims, a Democrat, entered the race for mayor, still considered a non-partisan position, against his former fellow-commissioner and by then Republican mayoral incumbent Arthur R. Outlaw. Shortly afterwards, he was charged in three counts of a 35-count racketeering indictment by Jeff Sessions, then U.S. attorney for the United States District Court for the Southern District of Alabama  (from 1981 to 1994). The charges concerned negotiations that had taken place four years earlier, when Mims was still in office, for the construction of a trash-to-steam energy plant that was never built. Mims claimed that Republicans  had timed the charges to halt his political campaign, and called them "a satanic attack." After a trial with four co-defendants in April 1990, a jury convicted Mins of two counts of extortion in violation of the Hobbs Act. After serving 46 months of a 10-year prison sentence, Mims was paroled in 1997. He filed a civil suit that year to have his sentence vacated, but was unsuccessful.

Later life

In his final years, Mims ran a real estate business in Mobile and continued civic participation through the Waterfront Rescue Mission, as well as assisting at local nursing homes and other charitable institutions. In 2005, Mims self-published his autobiography, Mayor on a Mission: From the Cotton Patch to City Hall.

Death and legacy

Mims died of natural causes on November 25, 2008. He donated his papers to the University of South Alabama.

Bibliography
For Christ and Country, Old Tappan, N.J., 1969)
Mayor on Mission: From the Cotton Patch to City Hall, Coral Springs, Fla., 2005

References

1930 births
2008 deaths
People from Monroe County, Alabama
Mayors of Mobile, Alabama
20th-century American politicians